Thomas Andrew Hickey (born 30 August 1976) is an Irish sportsperson.  He plays hurling with his local club Dunnamaggin and was a member of the Kilkenny senior inter-county team from 1998 until 1999.  His brother, Noel, won 9 All-Ireland medals with Kilkenny before he retired himself in 2013.

References

1976 births
Living people
Dunnamaggin hurlers
Kilkenny inter-county hurlers